A shelf stereo, also stereo, micro component system or mini component system, is a stereo system that is generally small enough to fit on an average shelf and sold with all necessary components packaged together. They may accept various media or connect to other systems.

Description 
A shelf stereo is a compact stereo system. The systems are usually both small enough to fit on an average shelf (hence their name) and sold with all of their necessary components packaged together, if not outright integrated into the same physical enclosure.

Components 
Shelf stereos may accept different types of media. Many stereos come with or have the ability to connect to other systems. Media and connections include:
 radio
 cassette
 CD
 a digital audio player (for e.g. MP3 or FLAC audio files), such as iPod
 Bluetooth devices
 USB flash memory drives
 satellite radio
 turntable

See also
 Music centre
 Portable media player
 Table radio

References

Audio players
Consumer electronics